Aconitum variegatum is a species of flowering plant belonging to the family Ranunculaceae.

Its native range is Central and Southeastern Europe to Central Ukraine.

References

variegatum